Curtitoma niigataensis is a species of sea snail, a marine gastropod mollusk in the family Mangeliidae.

Description

Distribution
This species occurs in the Sea of Japan.

References

 Bogdanov, I.P. & Ito, K. (1992) The Oenopotinae (Gastropoda: Turridae) mollusks from the southeastern part of the Japan Sea. Venus, 51, 11–41

External links
  Tucker, J.K. 2004 Catalog of recent and fossil turrids (Mollusca: Gastropoda). Zootaxa 682: 1–1295.

niigataensis
Gastropods described in 1992